Strange Empire is a Canadian Western television series that aired on CBC Television in the 2014–15 television season. Created by Laurie Finstad-Knizhnik, the series is a serialized drama set in Janestown, near the Alberta-Montana border in the 1860s, in which three women band together for survival after their husbands are murdered.

The cast includes Cara Gee, Melissa Farman and Tattiawna Jones. The first season began airing on 6 October 2014 and consists of 13 episodes.

CBC cancelled the series in March 2015 after one season. Strange Empire was broadcast on LMN in the US and was renamed Strange Empire: Rise of the Women, it premiered on May 29, 2015.

Cast and characters
 Cara Gee as Kat Loving, a Métis woman who loses her child and her husband and struggles to protect her surrogate family.
 Melissa Farman as Rebecca Blithely, an autistic woman who was previously institutionalized and who now works as a doctor.  
 Tattiawna Jones as Isabelle Slotter, a madam who is grieving after the loss of her child.
 Aaron Poole as John Slotter, a violent mine owner, who is married to Isabelle.
 Michelle Creber as Kelly and Matreya Scarrwener as Robin, sisters who are rescued and adopted by Kat Loving after their gambling father sells them to Slotter for use in his bordello.
 Terry Chen as Ling, a Chinese man looking to take over Slotter's coal mine.
 Anne Marie DeLuise as Mrs. Briggs, a widow who runs a cantine.
 Tahmoh Penikett as Marshal Caleb Mecredi, a Métis lawman who is attracted to Kat and determined to bring John Slotter to justice.
 Joanna Boland as Morgan Finn, a miner in the town who begins a relationship with Rebecca, while trying to hide that he is actually a woman.

Episodes

Reception
The series premiere was watched by 319,000 Canadian viewers.

John Doyle of The Globe and Mail called it "a remarkable, rugged western drama" and praised the cast. Doyle concluded "Strange Empire wobbles a bit in episodes two and three, but never falls down. Watch and you are carried through on the freshness and zest of it, this dose of hard, rugged TV storytelling."

Canadian Screen Awards

Joey Awards

Leo Awards

Young Artist Awards

Home media release
eOne Films released season 1 on DVD on May 12, 2015.

References

External links

 

2010s Canadian drama television series
2014 Canadian television series debuts
CBC Television original programming
2010s Western (genre) television series
2015 Canadian television series endings
Canadian Western (genre) television series
Autism in television